Othello is a ballet in three acts based on the play of the same name by William Shakespeare. Choreography by Lar Lubovitch is set to an orchestral score composed by Elliot Goldenthal and released commercially on the Varèse Sarabande label. Originally produced in 1997, the ballet was commissioned by the American Ballet Theatre and the San Francisco Ballet.

The score is generally less atonal than many of Goldenthal's film scores but vastly more complex as he is required to provide not only the music but also all of the complex ambience and to set the pace and rhythm for the dancers on the stage.

Album track listing
 Act I: Sarabande (3:12)
 Act I: Entrada (2:24)
 Act I: Carnival Dance (2:09)
 Act I: Cassio (2:36)
 Act I: Formal Court Dance (5:09)
 Act I: Othello And Desdemona (6:08)
 Act I: Zigzag Dance (1:47)
 Act I: Iago And Emilia (5:06)
 Act II: Storm And Ships' Arrival (8:51)
 Act II: Tarantella (14:12)
 Act III: Lies And Variations: Lies And Variations/Iago And Othello/Othello's Solo Dance (7:44)
 Act III: Desdemona's Prayer (5:25)
 Act III: Adagietto And Coda Agitato (6:25)

Album crew
Music Composed and Orchestrated by Elliot Goldenthal
Recording Produced by Joel Iwataki
Executive Producer: Robert Townson
Performed by the San Francisco Ballet Orchestra
Conducted by Emil de Cou
Recorded and Mixed and Edited by Joel Iwataki

References

External links
 A review of the ballet score at 'Filmtracks.com'.
 The page for the album at Goldenthal's website.
 Varèse Sarabande page for the score.
 Goldenthal discussing the score in three videos.

 

Compositions by Elliot Goldenthal
Ballet music
1997 compositions
Works based on Othello
Ballets based on works by William Shakespeare
1997 ballet premieres